"There's No Love in Rock and Roll" is a 6-page comic book story from True Life Romance, No. 3 published by Ajax in August 1956. The plot concerns defiant teenager Shirley and the irritation she causes her parents by dating a boy who loves rock and roll. Shirley tells the reader on the first page: "No one understands the teenagers? That's because they don't want to be understood! It points out our flaws! Our pretense that were so important, that we have to have a world of our own!" She ultimately renounces the boy and meets a square-shooter who likes traditional adult music. Her parents are thrilled. Shirley states in the last panel, "Gee! I can't believe that I ever enjoyed that horrible rock and roll stuff—it's just plain noise!" The story was published in the infancy of rock and roll and was reprinted by indie publisher New England Comics in "My Terrible Romance" in 1994.

References 
 

Books about rock music
Romance comics
1956 in comics